The Commonwealth Bank Trophy, also referred to as the National Netball League, was the top level national Australian netball league between 1997 and 2007. The league was organized by Netball Australia. Its main sponsor was the Commonwealth Bank. Melbourne Phoenix were the competition's most successful team, winning five premierships. Sydney Swifts were the second most successful team, winning four premierships. Between them, Phoenix and Swifts played in every grand final, except in 1999 when Adelaide Thunderbirds won the second of their two premierships. In 2008, the Commonwealth Bank Trophy league was replaced by the ANZ Championship.

Teams

The founding members of the Commonwealth Bank Trophy league included Adelaide Ravens, Adelaide Thunderbirds, Melbourne Kestrels, Melbourne Phoenix, Perth Orioles, Sydney Sandpipers, Sydney Swifts and Queensland Firebirds. The majority of the teams were named after native Australian birds including ravens, kestrels, orioles and sandpipers. Adelaide Thunderbirds were initially going to be named Adelaide Falcons but the name was changed at the request of the rugby union team. In 2003 Ravens were replaced by AIS Canberra Darters and in 2004 Sandpipers were replaced by Hunter Jaegers.

In 2008, when the Commonwealth Bank Trophy league was replaced by the ANZ Championship, Thunderbirds and Firebirds became founders of the new league. Several other Commonwealth Bank Trophy teams were transformed to form ANZ Championship teams. Swifts and Jaegers merged to become New South Wales Swifts, Kestrels and Phoenix merged to become Melbourne Vixens and  Orioles were rebranded as West Coast Fever. Meanwhile the Australian Institute of Sport and Canberra Darters ended their partnership and in 2008 entered two separate team in the Australian Netball League.

2007 teams

Earlier teams

Grand finals

Minor premierships

Awards

Most Valuable Player

Players' Player of the Year

Grand final MVP

Best New Talent

Coach of the Year

Margaret Pewtress Team of the Year

Television
ABC were the Commonwealth Bank Trophy league's official broadcast partner.

References

 
Defunct netball leagues in Australia
Defunct professional sports leagues in Australia
1997 establishments in Australia
2007 disestablishments in Australia
Sports leagues established in 1997
Sports leagues disestablished in 2007
Trophy